Karti (also Romanized as Kartī, Keretī, and Kerti) is a village in Piveshk Rural District, Lirdaf District, Jask County, Hormozgan Province, Iran. At the 2006 census, its population was 522, in 120 families.

References 

Populated places in Jask County